The Palestinian Scout Association  is the organization responsible for the Scout movement in Palestine.

The Palestinian Scout Association serves youth throughout the State of Palestine. The headquarters are in Ramallah in the West Bank, and the International Commissioner is Dr. Fayeq H. Tahboub.

On 27 February 2016, the Palestinian Scout Association gained back the initial full voting rights in World Organization of the Scout Movement. In 2017, it became a full member of the World Association of Girl Guides and Girl Scouts.

History
The Scout movement in Palestine started in 1912 at St. George's School in Jerusalem, and participated in the World Scout Jamborees in 1929 and 1933.

The Association was recognized by the World Scout Bureau in 1945. The modern Palestinian Scout Association was formed in exile due to the 1948 war. However, recognition was withdrawn in 1949.

According to the WOSM a recognition of Scout movements is possible only when Scouting is active and operating within the borders of its own national state that has a seat in the United Nations. Palestine was admitted in 1993 as a special member. Official recognition was restored by the World Scout Conference in 1996. The president of the Israel Scouting Federation made a statement asking the World Scout Conference to support the proposal. His speech was received with a standing ovation. The Palestinian Scout Association was accepted as an Associate WOSM Member. On 27 February 2016, the World Scout Committee recognized the Palestinian Scout Association as the National Scout Organization of the State of Palestine and conferred the Association with Full WOSM Membership with voting rights. The membership certificate was to be presented to the organisation during the 41st World Scout Conference, to be conducted in Baku, Azerbaijan in 2017.

Program and ideals
As of 2009, 18,738 members were registered in the Palestinian Scout Association. 35% belong to school groups, and the rest to open or religious groups, predominantly Muslim and Christian.

The Scout Motto is Kun Musta'idan or كن مستعدًا, translating as Be Prepared in Arabic. The noun for a single Scout is kaššaf or كشاف in Arabic.

Girl Guides of Palestine 

The Girl Guides of Palestine is the national Guiding organization of the Palestinian National Authority. As of 2005, the association was granted the official status of "Working towards WAGGGS membership" by the World Association of Girl Guides and Girl Scouts acknowledging the development of the association.

Girl Guides were established in the British Mandate of Palestine in 1919, in association with the Girl Guides Association in England. In 1927, a visitor reported that the movement had 260 Guides and 10 Rangers, most of them Arabs. The Palestinian Director of Education, Humphrey Bowman, described the association as "side by side with the Boy Scouts but under an independent body and organized under strictly harim conditions." Like the Boy Scouts, it was confined to the Arab community. The Guiders were recruited from among teachers in the government and private schools. Some Girl Guide troops participated in demonstrations during the 1930s, paralleling the activities of the Palestinian Boy Scouts, a politically active group in the 1930s.

Emblems
The emblem of the Palestinian Scout Association incorporates elements of the coat of arms of Palestine.

See also

References

External links
Palestinian Scout Association official website

World Organization of the Scout Movement member organizations
World Association of Girl Guides and Girl Scouts member organizations
Scouting and Guiding in the State of Palestine
Youth organizations established in 1912
1912 establishments in the Ottoman Empire